Danish Film Critics Association (until 2013 Filmmedarbejderforeningen) is a film critics association that annually since 1948 have handed out the Bodil Awards.

References

External links
  

Film organizations in Denmark